Brooke Addamo (born 2 January 1991), better known by her stage name Owl Eyes, is an Australian recording artist from Melbourne signed to the Illusive / Wunderkind Label with distribution through Universal Music Group. She released her debut studio album Nightswim in April 2013, which peaked at number 28 on the ARIA Charts.

Career

2008: Australian Idol
In 2008, Addamo successfully auditioned for the 6th season of Australian Idol. She reached the finals and finished in 11th place.

2009-2012: Faces, Raiders & Crystalised
In September 2010, Owl Eyes released her debut extended play Faces. She also featured on the Illy single "It Can Wait". The song was certified gold in Australia in 2011.

In May 2011, Owl Eyes released "Raiders", the lead single from her second extended play of the same name, which was released in July. In April 2012, Owl Eyes released "Crystalised", the lead single from her third extended play of the same name, which was released in May. In August 2012, Owl Eyes released the single "Love Run Dry", which was later included as a bonus track on her debut studio album Nightswim.

2013-2016: Nightswim
In March 2013, Owl Eyes released "Closure", the lead single from her debut studio album Nightswim. In April 2013, Owl Eyes released Nightswim, which debuted and peaked at number 28 on the Australian ARIA Charts. The album was co-produced by Jan Skubiszewski and Stylaz Fuego. A remix EP was released in October 2013, featuring eight tracks. Three further singles were released from the album and she toured in support of the album around Australia in 2013.

In 2015, she performed a number of tracks with Flight Facilities and the Melbourne Symphony Orchestra at a concert at the Sidney Myer Music Bowl. The performance was released in December 2015 as part of Flight Facilities' live album Live with the Melbourne Symphony Orchestra, which won the ARIA Award for Best Classical Album at the ARIA Music Awards of 2016.

2018–present: Invisible Woman
In November 2018, Owl Eyes released her first new single in four years, "On Me". 

In April 2020, Owl Eyes released the single "Tokyo." On 29 May 2020 she released her six track EP Invisible Woman.

Discography

Studio albums

Extended plays

Singles

As lead artist

As featured artist

Awards

AIR Awards
The Australian Independent Record Awards (commonly known informally as AIR Awards) is an annual awards night to recognise, promote and celebrate the success of Australia's Independent Music sector.

|-
| AIR Awards of 2011
| "It Can Wait" (with Illy)
| Best Independent Single/EP
| 
|-

References

External links

 
Take Five With… Brooke Addamo (OWL EYES) - LifeMusicMedia
the AU interview: Brooke Addamo of Owl Eyes (Melbourne) | the AU review
Purple Sneakers interview with Owl Eyes (2011)
 Music Feeds interview with Owl Eyes (2013)
 Australian Musician interview with Owl Eyes (2013)
 Flight Facilities - Clair De Lune with Owl Eyes & the MSO (2016)
 Owl Eyes - On Me (A Capella) (2019)

Living people
Musicians from Melbourne
Australian indie pop musicians
Australian Idol participants
Australian multi-instrumentalists
1991 births
21st-century Australian singers
21st-century Australian women singers